Micfalău is a commune in Covasna County, Transylvania, Romania. It is composed of a single village, Micfalău.

History 

It formed part of the Székely Land region of the historical Transylvania province. Until 1918, the village belonged to the Háromszék County of the Kingdom of Hungary. After the Treaty of Trianon of 1920, it became part of Romania.

Later, it became a component village of Malnaș, but became an independent commune when it split in 2004.

Demographics 

The commune has an absolute Székely Hungarian majority. According to the 2011 Census it has a population of 1,824 of which 97.04% or 1,770 are Hungarian.

References

Communes in Covasna County
Localities in Transylvania